Victor Neuburg may refer to:

Victor Benjamin Neuburg (1883-1940), English poet, publisher and occultist
Victor E. Neuburg (1924-1996), English academic and author